The Link Men was an Australian television series shown in 1970.

Synopsis
The series was the first drama series made in-house by the Nine Network as part of an attempt to rival the cop shows produced by Crawford Productions such as Homicide and Division 4. The Link Men starred Kevin Miles, Bruce Montague and Tristan Rogers as three detectives working in the city of Sydney. The series was devised and produced by Glyn Davies who had created The Rat Catchers for ITV (Associated-Rediffusion Television).
The director (for the pilot episode and for many of the rest of the series) was Australian film director Jonathan Dawson.

Production
The show lasted for thirteen episodes.  The aforementioned Tristan Rogers would go on to greater fame on the American daytime serial General Hospital, where he has appeared as Robert Scorpio off and on since 1980.

External links
 
 The Link Men episode guide at Memorable TV
 The Link Men at Classic Australian Television
 The Link Men at the National Film and Sound Archive

1970s Australian drama television series
Nine Network original programming
1970s Australian crime television series
1970 Australian television series debuts
1970 Australian television series endings
Black-and-white Australian television shows